Nikita Olegovich Tserenok (born July 27, 1993) a Russian professional ice hockey defenceman who currently plays for Admiral Vladivostok of the Kontinental Hockey League (KHL). Tserenok selected 154th overall in the seventh round of 2010 KHL Junior Draft by Ak Bars Kazan.

References

External links

1993 births
Living people
Admiral Vladivostok players
Barys Nur-Sultan players
Russian ice hockey defencemen
Snezhnye Barsy players
Ice hockey people from Moscow